And That's Not All... is a Bananarama videos compilation from 1984, which features the music videos that were to the singles from the Deep Sea Skiving and Bananarama albums. The video also featured two extra tracks,  The Wild Life, a non-UK released single was as well as the "Bananarama" album track, "State I'm In", which was slated for a single release but was later cancelled.  The video also featured snippets and behind the scenes footage of the girls.

Videos
 "Robert De Niro's Waiting..."
Directed by Duncan Gibbins
 "Really Saying Something"
Directed by Midge Ure & Chris Cross
 "Shy Boy"
Directed by Midge Ure & Chris Cross
 "Cheers Then"
Directed by Keef
 "Na Na Hey Hey (Kiss Him Goodbye)"
Directed by Keef
 "Cruel Summer"
 "Rough Justice"
Directed by Jonathan Gershfield
 "State I'm In"
Directed by Jonathan Gershfield
 "Hot Line To Heaven"
Directed by Jonathan Gershfield
 "The Wild Life"

Bananarama video albums
1984 video albums
Music video compilation albums
1984 compilation albums